The 54th Grand Bell Awards, also known as Daejong Film Awards, are determined and presented annually by The Motion Pictures Association of Korea for excellence in film in South Korea. The Grand Bell Awards were first presented in 1962 and have gained prestige as the Korean equivalent of the American Academy Awards.

Nominations and winners
Nominations were announced September 29, 2017.

References

External links
 

Grand Bell Awards